Elections in Ohio are held on a county, state, and federal level. The Republicans are strongest in the rural Northwest, the affluent Cincinnati and Columbus suburbs, and have made gains in Appalachian Southeast Ohio and the industrial, working-class Northeast in the 21st century. The Democrats rely on the state's major cities, and have made gains in educated suburban areas in recent years.

The state was strongly Republican from the party's inception, as it voted Republican in every election from 1856 to 1908. The northern Union-aligned part of the state kept the state Republican, and consistently narrowed edged out the Democratic and Appalachia-influenced southern Ohio. Since 1896, however, Ohio has voted for the winning candidate, except for Franklin D Roosevelt in 1944, John F Kennedy in 1960, and Joe Biden in 2020. This was due to Democratic gains in the northeastern part of the state. The state has not backed a losing candidate in consecutive elections since 1848. Due to a close split in party registration, it has been key battleground state. No Republican has ever been elected president without winning Ohio. In 2004, Ohio was the tipping point state, as Bush won the state with 51% of the vote, giving him its 20 electoral votes and the margin he needed in the Electoral College for re-election. The state was closely contested in 2008 and 2012, with Barack Obama winning narrowly on both occasions. Ohio has been a bellwether state in presidential elections.

Since 2016, Ohio's bellwether status has been questioned given that Donald Trump won it by 8 points, the largest margin for each party since 1988, and then won the state by a similar margin in 2020 despite losing nationwide.

In a 2020 study, Ohio was ranked as the 17th hardest state for citizens to vote in.

Federal elections
House: 1964, 2006, 2008, 2010, 2012, 2014, 2016, 2018, 2020, 2022
Senate: 1964, 2006, 2010, 2012, 2016, 2018, 2022
Presidential primary: 2008 Democratic 2008 Republican 2012 Republican 2016 Democratic 2016 Republican 2020 Democratic 2020 Republican

State elections
Ohio Attorney General elections
Ohio State Auditor elections
Ohio gubernatorial elections
Ohio lieutenant gubernatorial elections
Ohio Secretary of State elections
Ohio Supreme Court elections
Ohio State Treasurer elections

Local elections
City Council of Cincinnati, Ohio elections
City Commission of Dayton, Ohio elections
Politics of Dayton, Ohio
Montgomery County, Ohio elections

Election security
In the leadup to the 2020 Ohio elections, by February 2020, eight Ohio counties had failed to complete an election security checklist required by Ohio's top election official. One county, Van Wert County Board of Elections, was placed on administrative oversight because it provided no plan for complying with the directive.

See also
2020 Ohio elections
Ohio Ballot Board
Political party strength in Ohio
Golden Week (Ohio)
United States presidential elections in Ohio
Women's suffrage in Ohio

References

External links
Elections & Voting at the Ohio Secretary of State official website

 
 
  (State affiliate of the U.S. League of Women Voters)
 . (Also: 1995 & 1996, 1997 & 1998, 1999 & 2000, 2001 & 2002, 2003 & 2004,  2005 & 2006, 2007 & 2008, 2009 & 2010, 2011 & 2012, 2013 & 2014, 2015 & 2016, 2017 & 2018).
 Digital Public Library of America. Assorted materials related to Ohio elections
 

Political events in Ohio
Government of Ohio